Jan Zimmer may refer to:

 Ján Zimmer, a Slovak post-romantic composer (1926-1993)
 Hans Zimmer, a German film composer and music producer (b. 1957)
 Jean Zimmer, a German footballer (b. 1992)